Arthur Ray "Skip" Johnson (born February 17, 1967) is an American college baseball coach and former player. He is head baseball coach at the University of Oklahoma. He played college baseball at Ranger College from 1986 to 1987, the University of North Texas in 1988 and the University of Texas–Pan American in 1989. He served as the head coach of Navarro College from 1994 to 2006.

Head coaching record

See also
 List of current NCAA Division I baseball coaches

References

External links
Oklahoma Sooners bio

1967 births
Living people
Sportspeople from Denton, Texas
Ranger Rangers baseball players
North Texas Mean Green baseball players
UT Rio Grande Valley Vaqueros baseball players
Navarro Bulldogs baseball coaches
Texas Longhorns baseball coaches
Oklahoma Sooners baseball coaches